Diplomatic relations between Albania and Hungary were established for the first time on March, 1922 with credentials presented on May 31st of that same year.

List of diplomatic representatives of Albania to Hungary (1923–present)

References 

 
Hungary
Albania